94.3 Hope Radio (DXMH 94.3 MHz) is an FM station owned and operated by Adventist Media. Its studios and transmitter are located at Globesite SDA Compound, Stampa Beach, Brgy. Dahican, Mati, Davao Oriental. The frequency is formerly owned by Century Broadcasting Network.

References

External links
Hope Radio Mati FB Page

Radio stations in Davao Oriental
Radio stations established in 2012
Christian radio stations in the Philippines